Qara Su, Qarasu or Los Island, is an uninhabited sandy island south of the Bay of Baku, Azerbaijan. 

The island is part of the Baku Archipelago, which consists of the following islands: Boyuk Zira or Nargin, Dash Zira, Qum Island, Zenbil, Sangi-Mugan, Chikil, Qara Su, Khara Zira, Gil, Ignat Dash and a few smaller ones.

Geography
Qara Su is an island of tectonic origin. Formerly there were large gas fields on the island.

Ecology
There is very little vegetation on the island due to oil pollution as well as other factors.

Caspian seals, sturgeon, and numerous types of birds, such as teal ducks, herring gulls, and grebes are some of the species that can be found on and around Qara Su Island.

References

Uninhabited islands of Azerbaijan
Islands of the Caspian Sea
Islands of Azerbaijan